The 2018–19 season was the 114th season of competitive football in Turkey.

Pre-season

League tables

Süper Lig

1.Lig

Turkish Cup

Final

National team

Friendlies

2018–19 UEFA Nations League

UEFA Euro 2020 qualification

Turkish clubs in Europe

UEFA Champions League

Third qualifying round

Group stage

Group D

UEFA Europa League

Second qualifying round

Third qualifying round

Play-off round

Group stage

Group D

Group I

Group J

Knockout phase

Round of 32

References

 
Seasons in Turkish football
Turkish 2018